Tarkianite is a rhenium sulfide mineral. Its type locality is the Hitura Nickel Mine in Nivala, Finland. It was approved as the first rhenium mineral in 2003 and formally described in 2004.

References

Sulfide minerals
Rhenium minerals
Copper minerals
Iron minerals
Molybdenum minerals
Minerals described in 2004